The history of the city of Portland, Oregon, began in 1843 when business partners William Overton and Asa Lovejoy filed to claim land on the west bank of the Willamette River in Oregon Country. In 1845 the name of Portland was chosen for this community by coin toss.  February 8, 1851, the city was incorporated. Portland has continued to grow in size and population, with the 2010 Census showing 583,776 residents in the city.

Early history
The land today occupied by Multnomah County, Oregon, was inhabited for centuries by two bands of Upper Chinook Indians. The Multnomah people settled on and around Sauvie Island and the Cascades Indians settled along the Columbia Gorge. These groups fished and traded along the river and gathered berries, wapato and other root vegetables. The nearby Tualatin Plains provided prime hunting grounds. Eventually, contact with Europeans resulted in the decimation of native tribes by smallpox and malaria.

Founding

The site of the future city of Portland, Oregon, was known to American, Canadian, and British traders, trappers and settlers of the 1830s and early 1840s as "The Clearing," a small stopping place along the west bank of the Willamette River used by travelers en route between Oregon City and Fort Vancouver. As early as 1840, Massachusetts sea captain John Couch logged an encouraging assessment of the river’s depth adjacent to The Clearing, noting its promise of accommodating large ocean-going vessels, which could not ordinarily travel up-river as far as Oregon City, the largest Oregon settlement at the time. In 1843, Tennessee pioneer William Overton and Boston, Massachusetts lawyer Asa Lovejoy filed a  land claim with Oregon's provisional government that encompassed The Clearing and nearby waterfront and timber land. Legend has it that Overton had prior rights to the land but lacked funds, so he agreed to split the claim with Lovejoy, who paid the 25-cent filing fee.

Bored with clearing trees and building roads, Overton sold his half of the claim to Francis W. Pettygrove of Portland, Maine, in 1845. When it came time to name their new town, Pettygrove and Lovejoy both had the same idea: to name it after his home town. They flipped a coin to decide, and Pettygrove won. On November 1, 1846, Lovejoy sold his half of the land claim to Benjamin Stark, as well as his half-interest in a herd of cattle for $1,215.

Three years later, Pettygrove had lost interest in Portland and become enamored with the California Gold Rush. On September 22, 1848, he sold the entire townsite, save only for 64 sold lots and two blocks each for himself and Stark, to Daniel H. Lownsdale, a tanner. Although Stark owned fully half of the townsite, Pettygrove "largely ignor[ed] Stark's interest", in part because Stark was on the east coast with no immediate plans to return to Oregon. Lownsdale paid for the site with $5,000 in leather, which Pettygrove presumably resold in San Francisco for a large profit.

On March 30, 1849, Lownsdale split the Portland claim with Stephen Coffin, who paid $6,000 for his half. By August 1849, Captain John Couch and Stark were pressuring Lownsdale and Coffin for Stark's half of the claim; Stark had been absent, but was using the claim as equity in an East Coast-California shipping business with the Sherman Brothers of New York.

In December 1849, William W. Chapman bought what he believed was a third of the overall claim for $26,666, plus his provision of free legal services for the partnership. In January 1850, Lownsdale had to travel to San Francisco to negotiate on the land claim with Stark, leaving Chapman with power of attorney. Stark and Lownsdale came to an agreement on March 1, 1850, which gave to Stark the land north of Stark Street and about $3,000 from land already sold in this area. This settlement reduced the size of Chapman's claim by approximately 10%. Lownsdale returned to Portland in April 1850, where the terms were presented to an unwilling Chapman and Coffin, but who agreed after negotiations with Couch. While Lownsdale was gone, Chapman had given himself block 81 on the waterfront and sold all of the lots on it, and this block was included in the Stark settlement area. Couch's negotiations excluded this property from Stark's claim, allowing Chapman to retain the profits on the lot.

However, Portland's location at the Willamette's confluence with the Columbia River, accessible to deep-draft vessels, gave it a key advantage over the older peer. It also triumphed over early rivals such as Milwaukie and Linnton. In its first census in 1850, the city's population was 821 and, like many frontier towns, was predominantly male, with 653 male whites, 164 female whites and four "free colored" individuals. It was already the largest settlement in the Pacific Northwest, and while it could boast about its trading houses, hotels and even a newspaper—the Weekly Oregonian—it was still very much a frontier village, derided by outsiders as "Stumptown" and "Mudtown." It was a place where "stumps from fallen firs lay scattered dangerously about Front and First Streets … humans and animals, carts and wagons slogged through a sludge of mud and water … sidewalks often disappeared during spring floods."

The first firefighting service was established in the early 1850s, with the volunteer Pioneer Fire Engine Company.  In 1854, the city council voted to form the Portland Fire Department, and following an 1857 reorganization it encompassed three engine companies and 157 volunteer firemen.

Late 19th century

A major fire swept through downtown in August 1873, destroying 20 blocks along the west side of the Willamette between Yamhill and Morrison. The fire caused $1.3 million in damage. In 1889, The Oregonian called Portland "the most filthy city in the Northern States", due to the unsanitary sewers and gutters. The West Shore reported "The new sidewalks put down this year are a disgrace to a Russian village."

The first Morrison Street Bridge opened in 1887 and was the first bridge across the Willamette River in Portland.

Portland was the major port in the Pacific Northwest for much of the 19th century, until the 1890s, when direct railroad access between the deepwater harbor in Seattle and points east, by way of Stampede Pass, was built. Goods could then be transported from the northwest coast to inland cities without the need to navigate the dangerous bar at the mouth of the Columbia River.

The city merged with Albina and East Portland in 1891. This made Portland the 41st largest city in the country, with approximately 70,000 residents. This merger was followed by the annexation of the neighboring city of Sellwood in 1893.

Early 20th century

In 1905, Portland was the host city of the Lewis and Clark Centennial Exposition, a world's fair. This event increased recognition of the city, which contributed to a doubling of the population of Portland, from 90,426 in 1900 to 207,214 in 1910. 

In 1912 the city's 52 distinctive bronze temperance fountains known locally as "Benson bubblers" were installed around the downtown area by logging magnate Simon Benson.  

In 1915, the city merged with Linnton and St. Johns.

July 1913 saw a free speech fight when, during a strike by women workers at the Oregon Packing Company, Mayor Henry Albee declared street speaking illegal, with an exception made for religious speech. This declaration was intended to stop public speeches by the Industrial Workers of the World in support of the strikers.

On June 9, 1934, approximately 1,400 members of the International Longshoremen's Association (ILA) participated in the West Coast waterfront strike, which shut down shipping in every port along the West Coast.  The demands of the ILA were: recognition of the union; wage increases from 85 cents to $1.00 per hour straight time and from $1.25 to $1.50 per hour overtime; a six-hour workday and 30-hour work week; and a closed shop with the union in control of hiring.  They were also frustrated that shipping subsidies from the government, in place since industry distress in the 1920s, were leading to larger profits for the shipping companies that weren't passed down to the workers.  There were numerous incidents of violence between strikers and police, including strikers storming the Admiral Evans, which was being used as a hotel for strikebreakers; police shooting four strikers at Terminal 4 in St. Johns; and special police shooting at Senator Robert Wagner of New York as he inspected the site of the previous shooting. The longshoremen resumed work on July 31, 1934, after voting to arbitrate.  The arbitration decision was handed down on October 12, 1934, awarding the strikers with recognition of the ILA; higher pay of 95 cents per hour straight time and $1.40 per hour overtime, retroactive to the return to work on July 31; six-hour workdays and 30-hour workweeks, and a union hiring hall managed jointly by the union and management – though the union selected the dispatcher – in every port along the entire West Coast.

World War II
In 1940, Portland was on the brink of an economic and population boom, fueled by over $2 billion spent by the U.S. Congress on expanding the Bonneville Power Administration, the need to produce materiel for Great Britain's increased preparations for war, as well as to meet the needs of the U.S. home front and the rapidly expanding American Navy.

The growth was led by Henry J. Kaiser, whose company had been the prime contractor in the construction of two Columbia River dams.  In 1941, Kaiser Shipyards received federal contracts to build Liberty ships and aircraft carrier escorts; he chose Portland as one of the sites, and built two shipyards along the Willamette River, and a third in nearby Vancouver; the 150,000 workers he recruited to staff these shipyards play a major role in the growth of Portland, which added 160,000 residents during World War II.
  By war's end, Portland had a population of 359,000, and an additional 100,000 people lived and/or worked in nearby cities such as Vanport, Oregon City, and Troutdale.

The war jobs attracted large numbers of African-Americans into the small existing community—the numbers quadrupled. The newcomers became permanent residents, building up black political influence, strengthening civil rights organizations 
such as the NAACP calling for antidiscrimination legislation. On the negative side, racial tensions increased, both black and white residential areas deteriorated from overcrowding, and inside the black community there were angry words between "old settlers" and recent arrivals vying for leadership in the black communities.

Postwar
The Vanport Flood of 1948.

The 1940s and 1950s also saw an extensive network of organized crime, largely dominated by Jim Elkins. The McClellan Commission determined in the late 1950s that Portland not only had a local crime problem, but also a situation that had serious national ramifications. In 1956 Oregonian reporters determined that corrupt Teamsters officials were plotting to take over the city's vice rackets.

Public transportation in Portland transitioned from private to public ownership in 1969–70, as the private companies found it increasingly difficult to make a profit and were on the verge of bankruptcy.  A new regional government agency, the Tri-County Metropolitan Transportation District (Tri-Met), replaced Rose City Transit in 1969 and the "Blue Bus" lines—connecting Portland with its suburbs—in 1970.

Freeway, Displacement, and Urban Renewal

Late 20th century
During the dot-com boom of the mid-to-late 1990s, Portland saw an influx of people in their 20s and 30s, drawn by the promise of a city with abundant nature, urban growth boundaries, cheaper rents, and opportunities to work in the graphic design and Internet industries,  as well as for companies like Doc Martens, Nike, Adidas, and Wieden+Kennedy. When this economic bubble burst, the city was left with a large creative population. Also, when the bubble burst in Seattle and San Francisco, even more artists streamed into Portland, drawn in part by its relatively low cost of living, for a West Coast city. In 2000, the U.S. census indicated there were over 10,000 artists in Portland.

Cultural history
While visual arts had always been important in the Pacific Northwest, the mid-1990s saw a dramatic rise in the number of artists, independent galleries, site-specific shows and public discourse about the arts. Several arts publications were founded. The Portland millennial art renaissance has been described, written about and commented on in publications such as ARTnews, Artpapers, Art in America, Modern Painters and Artforum and discussed on CNN.  The Wall Street Journal Peter Plagens noted the vibrancy of Portland's alternative art spaces.

See also
James B. Stephens
James C. Hawthorne
A Day Called 'X'
Columbus Day Storm of 1962
Mount Hood Freeway
Mayors of Portland
Timeline of Portland, Oregon
History of the Japanese in Portland, Oregon

References

Further reading

 ; full text online
  Abbott, Carl.  Portland in Three Centuries: The Place and the People (Oregon State University Press; 2011) 192 pages; scholarly history online
  Abbott, Carl.  Portland : gateway to the Northwest (1985) online
  In Three Volumes. Volume 1 | Volume 2 | Volume 3
 Johnston, Robert D. The Radical Middle Class: Populist Democracy and the Question of Capitalism in Progressive Era Portland, Oregon (2003) 

 
 Leeson, Fred. Rose City Justice: A Legal History of Portland, Oregon (Portland: Oregon Historical Society Press, 1998)
 
 ; online full text; also see online review
 
 MacColl, E. Kimbark, and Harry H. Stein. "The Economic Power of Portland's Early Merchants, 1851-1861." Oregon Historical Quarterly 89.2 (1988): 117-156.

  Elma MacGibbons reminiscences of her travels in the United States starting in 1898, which were mainly in Oregon and Washington. Includes chapter "Portland, the western hub."
 Merriam, Paul Gilman. "Portland, Oregon, 1840–1890: A Social and Economic History". Ph.D. dissertation. University of Oregon, Department of History, 1971.
 Mullins, William H. The Depression and the Urban West Coast, 1929-1933: Los Angeles, San Francisco, Seattle, and Portland (2000)
 
 
 Scott, H. W. ed. History of Portland, Oregon, with Illustrations and Biographical Sketches of Prominent Citizens and Pioneers (D. Mason & Company, 1890) 792pp full text online

External links
Postcards and snaps from the past at PdxHistory.com
Historical Timeline at Portland City Auditor's Office
Wartime Portland at Oregon Historical Society
Portland page at Oregon History Project (Oregon Historical Society)
Capsule histories of years 1974–99 at Willamette Week
 Transportation history, Portland Bureau of Transportation
A pictorial history of the Portland Waterfront
 

 
Willamette Valley
Portland, Oregon